Cadra perfasciata is a species of snout moth in the genus Cadra. It was described by Marianne Horak in 1994. It is found in the southern arid areas of Australia, on both sides of the Nullarbor Plain.

The wingspan is 14–17 mm for males and 15–18 mm for females. The head, thorax, forewing and abdomen are finely speckled with white and grey scales or white-tipped grey scales, with a wide colour range from pale (predominantly white scales) to dark grey.

References

Phycitini
Moths described in 1994
Taxa named by Marianne Horak
Moths of Australia